The 2019 Vuelta a España is the 74th edition of the Vuelta a España, one of cycling's Grand Tours. The Vuelta started in Torrevieja, with a team time trial on 24 August, and Stage 12 occurred on 5 September with a hilly stage from Circuito de Navarra. The race finished in Madrid on 15 September.

Classification standings

Stage 12
5 September 2019 — Circuito de Navarra to Bilbao,

Stage 13
6 September 2019 — Bilbao to Los Machucos,

Stage 14
7 September 2019 — San Vicente de la Barquera to Oviedo,

Stage 15
8 September 2019 — Tineo to Santuario del Acebo,

Stage 16

Rest day 2
10 September 2019 — León

Stage 17
11 September 2019 — Aranda de Duero to Guadalajara, 

This race was the first time a road race of over 200km had attained an average speed in excess of 50 km/h, and earned Gilbert the Ruban Jaune.

Stage 18
12 September 2019 — Colmenar Viejo to Becerril de la Sierra,

Stage 19
13 September 2019 — Ávila to Toledo,

Stage 20

Stage 21
15 September 2019 — Fuenlabrada to Madrid,

Notes

References

Sources

 

2019 Vuelta a España
Vuelta a España stages